What Are You Waiting For? is the first studio album by the pop punk band FM Static. As of the end of 2006, it has sold more than 60,000 copies.

Track listing

Personnel 
Trevor McNevan - vocals
Steve Augustine - drums
Justin Smith - bass
John Bunner - guitar
Produced and engineered by Aaron Sprinkle.

References

External links
 E-Card
 FM Static Website

2003 debut albums
FM Static albums
Tooth & Nail Records albums